Luciano Tessari (born 29 September 1928), was an Italian footballer and manager from San Martino Buon Albergo in the Province of Verona.

Tessari is most noted for his career at Roma where he spent a considerable number of seasons. In 1970, he came back to the club as manager on an interim basis after club president had gotten rid of Helenio Herrera.

His term of management was notable for losing the semi-final of the Cup Winners' Cup against Polish side Gornik Zabrze on a coin toss after a third deciding match ended in a draw after extra-time. Many Roma fans had celebrated victory well into the night after the second leg after mistakenly believing that away goals had counted double.

References

1928 births
Italian footballers
Italian football managers
Living people
Association football midfielders